Harrietsfield  is a rural  residential community in the Western region of the  Halifax Regional Municipality in district 18 on the Chebucto Peninsula on the Old Sambro Road (Route 306) 10 kilometers from Downtown Halifax.

History 
The community is named after the wife of Colonel William Thompson who lived in the area in the 1780s.  In 1790, Casper Gruber arrived, and nine other families by 1827.  The community's population has been increasing slowly because of easy access to Halifax via the Old Sambro Road.

Notable places 
 Earth Station Telesat Canada
 RDM Recycling

Communications 
 Telephone exchange 902 - 479
 First three digits of postal code - B3V
 Internet - Cable- Eastlink

Demographics 
 Total Population - 849
 Total Dwellings  - 327
 Total Land Area  - 9.1977 km2

Parks 
 Long Lake Provincial Park

Schools 
 Harrietsfield Elementary School

References

 Explore HRM

Communities in Halifax, Nova Scotia
General Service Areas in Nova Scotia